First Nation Operated Schools in Manitoba and the rest of Canada are schools that are funded by the Government of Canada. In accordance with the Treaty arrangements between the federal government and most individual First Nations, First Nation Operated Schools must be administered by locally elected School boards, and operate outside the direct control of the local Chief and Band Council.

While there is no legislative requirement that Band Operated Schools follow Provincial Curricula, or adhere to the Manitoba Public Schools Act, or the Manitoba Education Administration Act, most First Nation Operated Schools do operate very closely to the way all Provincial Schools operate for the benefit of their students. By following Provincial Curricula, their students can more readily transfer from a Federal school to a Provincial school, and First Nation Operated Schools are able to retain High School Accreditation, so that their Secondary Graduates are recognized by Post-Secondary Institutions.

The most noticeable difference between First Nation Operated Schools and Provincial Schools is in the absence of professional organizations such as The Manitoba Teachers' Society(MTS). Of the fifty-one First Nations Communities that operate Federal Schools, only two have teachers who are members of the Provincial Union, which all other public school teachers are automatically members of under the Public Schools Act and Education Administration Act. The exceptions are members of the Nelson House Teachers' Association in Nisichawayasihk Cree Nation and the Sandy Bay Teachers' Association in Sandy Bay Ojibwa First Nation. The members of these two Bargaining Units have all the same rights and responsibilities as every other member of the Society, except they are not entitled to the MTS pension and disability benefits plans, as legislation does not exist that would allow these two groups to participate in the plan. The members of these two bargaining units pay the same annual dues as any other members in the Society.

List
Birdtail Sioux Nursery School - Birdtail Sioux First Nation, Manitoba 
Sargeant Tommy Prince School - Brokenhead Ojibway Nation, Manitoba
Wambdi Iyotake School - Canupawakpa Dakota Nation, Oak Lake, Manitoba
Chemawawin School - Chemawawin Cree Nation, Manitoba
Mahpiya Hdega School - Dakota Plains First Nation, Manitoba
Dakota Tipi School - Dakota Tipi First Nation, Manitoba
Dauphin River School - Dauphin River First Nation, Manitoba
Ebb & Flow School - Ebb & Flow First Nation, Manitoba
Pinaymootang School - Pinaymootang First Nation, Manitoba
Charles Sinclair School - Fisher River Cree Nation, Manitoba
Fox Lake School - Fox Lake Cree Nation, Manitoba
Kistigan Wacheeng - Garden Hill First Nation, Manitoba
Garden Hill First Nation High School - Garden Hill First Nation
God's Lake Narrows First Nation School - God's Lake First Nation, Manitoba	
Keeseekoowenin School - Keeseekoowenin Ojibway Nation, Manitoba
Lawrence Sinclair Memorial School - Kinonjeoshtegon First Nation, Manitoba
Lake Manitoba School - Lake Manitoba First Nation, Manitoba
Lake St. Martin School - Lake St. Martin First Nation, Manitoba
Little Black River School - Little Black River First Nation, Manitoba
Little Grand Rapids School - Little Grand Rapids First Nation, Manitoba
Little Saskatchewan H.A.G.M.E. School - Little Saskatchewan First Nation, Manitoba
Long Plain School - Long Plain First Nation, Manitoba
Amos Okemow Memorial School - Manto Sipi First Nation, Gods River, Manitoba
Sakastew School - Mathias Colomb First Nation, Pukatawagan, Manitoba
Miskooseepi School - Bloodvein First Nation, Bloodvein, Manitoba
Nisichawayasihk Neyo Ohtinwak Collegiate - Nisichawayasihk Cree Nation, Nelson House, Manitoba
Otetiskiwin Kiskinwamahtowekamik - Nisichawayasihk Cree Nation, Nelson House, Manitoba
Petit Casimir Memorial School - Northlands First Nation, Manitoba
Donald Ahmo School - O-Chi-Chak-Ko-Sipi First Nation, Manitoba
Joe A. Ross School - Opaskwayak Cree Nation, Manitoba
Oxford House Elementary School - Oxford House First Nation, Manitoba
1972 Memorial High School - Oxford House First Nation, Manitoba
Pauingassi School - Pauingassi First Nation, Manitoba
Peguis Central School - Peguis First Nation, Manitoba
Mikisew Middle School - Pimicikamak Cree Nation, Manitoba
Otter Nelson River School - Pimicikamak Cree Nation, Manitoba
Pine Creek School - Pine Creek First Nation, Manitoba
Poplar River School - Poplar River First Nation, Manitoba
Red Sucker Lake First Nation School - Red Sucker Lake First Nation, Manitoba
Wapi-Penace School - Rolling River First Nation, Manitoba
Ginew School - Roseau River Anishnaabe First Nation, Roseau River (Manitoba–Minnesota)
St. Theresa Point Elementary School - St. Theresa Point First Nation, Manitoba
St. Theresa Point High School - St. Theresa Point First Nation, Manitoba
St. Theresa Point Middle School - St. Theresa Point First Nation, Manitoba
Sagkeeng Anicinabe Community School - Sagkeeng First Nation, Manitoba
Sagkeeng Anicinabe High School - Sagkeeng First Nation, Manitoba
Sagkeeng Consolidated School - Sagkeeng First Nation, Manitoba
Isaac Beaulieu Memorial School - Sandy Bay Ojibway First Nation, Manitoba
Neil Dennis Kematch Memorial School - Sapotaweyak First Nation, Manitoba
Peter Yassie Memorial School - Sayisi Dene Nation, Manitoba
Abraham Beardy School - Shamattawa First Nation, Manitoba
Sioux Valley School - Sioux Valley Dakota Nation, Manitoba
Indian Springs School (Manitoba) - Swan Lake First Nation, Manitoba
Chief Sam Cook Mahmuwee Education Centre - Tataskweyak Cree Nation, Manitoba
Chief Clifford Lynxleg Anishinabe School - Tootinawaziibeeng Treaty Reserve, Manitoba
George Knott School - Wasagamack First Nation, Manitoba
Waywayseecappo Community School - Waywayseecappo First Nation, Manitoba
Wuskwi Sipihk School - Wuskwi Sipihk First Nation, Manitoba
George Saunders Memorial School - York Factory First Nation, Manitoba

School districts in Manitoba
First Nations culture
Lists of schools in Manitoba
First Nations in Manitoba